Alytus municipality may refer to:

 Alytus city municipality, Lithuania
 Alytus district municipality, Lithuania